The 2013 ASEAN Basketball League Regular Season was the fourth season of competition of the ASEAN Basketball League (ABL) since its establishment. A total of six teams competed in the league. The regular season began on 11 January 2013 and ended on 19 May 2013. Two teams from the previous season, inaugural champions AirAsia Philippine Patriots and Bangkok Cobras did not return for the current season.

Preseason

The ABL underwent contraction after it was announced that the Bangkok Cobras and the AirAsia Philippine Patriots would not be returning for the current season. The Brunei Barracudas, who were on leave for the 2012 season, were not announced to the list of active teams for 2013.

A new format was announced for the regular season, where the teams will play each four times, twice at home and twice away, a deviation from the earlier seasons where teams played each other thrice. Also, the league added Hoops Fest to the regular season schedule. The mid-season tournament was played over two days and the two games played by each team counted towards their regular season records. The playoff format was also changed: both the semifinals and the finals will be best-of-five series, instead of best-of-three in the previous seasons (in the inaugural season, the finals was a best-of-five series).

Arenas

Standings

Results
Score of the home team is listed first.
In case where a game went into overtime, the number of asterisks denotes the number of overtime periods played.
Results of the ABL Hoops Fest are not included in the tables.

First and second round

Third and fourth round

ABL Hoops Fest
The first ever ABL Hoops Fest, an annual mid-season showcase of the league, was added in the 2013 ABL season on 4 March 2013. All six teams will converge on a host city for the three-day contest, which will also include a slam dunk and three point shootout contest. The matchups are made via a random draw during the pre-season. Points obtained during Hoops Fest will count towards the teams’ total points for the regular season. Saigon, Vietnam was chosen as the host for the first edition of the competition, which was held 15 March 2013 to 17 March 2013.

Statistical leaders

Source:

Playoffs

The 2013 ABL Playoffs started on 23 May 2013 and concluded with the San Miguel Beermen sweeping the Indonesia Warriors in the 2013 ABL Finals to claim the team's first ever ABL title.

Semi-finals
The semi-finals is a best-of-five series, with the higher seeded team hosting Game 1 and 2, and 5, if necessary.
{{ThreeLegStart|legs=5

|}

Finals
The Finals is a best-of-five series, with the higher seeded team hosting Game 1 and 2, and 5, if necessary.

|}

References

External links
 Official website

 
2012–13 in Asian basketball leagues
2012-13
2012–13 in Philippine basketball
2012–13 in Malaysian basketball
2012–13 in Indonesian basketball
2012–13 in Singaporean basketball
2012–13 in Thai basketball
2012–13 in Vietnamese basketball